Cochylimorpha discopunctana is a species of moth of the family Tortricidae. It is found in Portugal, Spain, Romania, Russia (Kasan, Spassk, Sarepta, Uralsk), Mongolia and Transcaspia.

The wingspan is 13–17 mm. Adults have been recorded on wing from July to September.

References

Moths described in 1844
Cochylimorpha
Moths of Europe
Moths of Asia